Cnuibacter physcomitrellae is a species of bacteria. Cells are Gram-positive rods, strictly aerobic, non-sporeforming, and non-motile. C. physcomitrellae, was isolated from Physcomitrella patens, or spreading earthmoss. The genus is named after Capital Normal University (CNU) in Beijing, China.

References

Microbacteriaceae
Bacteria described in 2016
Monotypic bacteria genera